WKDB (95.3 FM) is a radio station broadcasting a Spanish hits music format. Licensed to Laurel, Delaware, United States, the station serves the Salisbury-Ocean City area.  The station is currently owned by The Voice Radio Network.

On August 24, 2009, Great Scott Broadcasting broke apart. The B 101.7/95.3, and began simulcasting Studio 106.1 on 95.3 FM with an old school R&B format. The format was dropped in late 2011, as the station reverted to a simulcast of WZEB.

On November 3, 2014, WKDB changed their format to Spanish hits, graded as "Maxima 95.3".

References

External links

KDB